The 2012 Maldives FA Cup Final is the 25th Final of the Maldives FA Cup.

The cup winner is guaranteed a place in the 2013 AFC Cup play-off.

Match

Details

See also
2012 Maldives FA Cup

References

Maldives FA Cup finals
FA Cup